Bev Cameron (born 17 June 1953) is a Canadian rower. She competed in the women's double sculls event at the 1976 Summer Olympics.

References

1953 births
Living people
Canadian female rowers
Olympic rowers of Canada
Rowers at the 1976 Summer Olympics
Rowers from Ottawa